Emerson Pereira Nunes (born March 21, 1981 in Belo Horizonte), sometimes known as just Emerson, is a former Brazilian central defender.

Honours
Botafogo
Taça Guanabara: 2009

Avaí
Campeonato Catarinense: 2010

References

External links
CBF  
Guardian Stats Centre

soccerterminal  
footballplus
goal.com  

1982 births
Living people
Brazilian footballers
Campeonato Brasileiro Série A players
Cruzeiro Esporte Clube players
C.D. Nacional players
Ipatinga Futebol Clube players
Botafogo de Futebol e Regatas players
Avaí FC players
Brazilian football managers
Avaí FC managers
Club Sportivo Sergipe players
Association football defenders
Footballers from Belo Horizonte